Chanda Rubin was the defending champion, but decided not to participate this year.

Meghann Shaughnessy won the title, defeating Iva Majoli 6–1, 6–3 in the final.

Seeds

Draw

Finals

Top half

Bottom half

References
Main Draw and Qualifying Draw

Challenge Bell
Tournoi de Québec
Can